The 1942 Bulgarian Cup Final was the 5th final of the Bulgarian Cup (in this period the tournament was named Tsar's Cup), and was contested between Levski Sofia and Sportklub Plovdiv on 3 October 1942 at Yunak Stadium in Sofia. Levski won the final 3–0 (walkover), claiming their first ever Bulgarian Cup title.

Match

Details

See also
1942 Bulgarian State Football Championship

References

Bulgarian Cup finals
PFC Levski Sofia matches
Cup Final